Patricia Dauder (born 1973 in Barcelona) is a Spanish artist based in Barcelona.

Exhibitions 

 Lugares Comprometidos: Topografía y Actualidad, Fundación ICO, Madrid, Spain
 Los Tiempos de un Lugar, CDAN, Centro de Arte y Naturaleza, Huesca, Spain
 Horitzontal/Orbital, Fundació Suñol, Barcelona
 Teahupoo, ProjecteSD Gallery, Barcelona
 There is No(w) Romanticism, Galerie Les Filles du Calvaire, Brussels, Belgium
 Eté 2009, Galerie Jocelyn Wolff, Paris, France
 Patricia Dauder and Dani Gal, Galerie Kadel Willborn, Kalsruhe, Germany
 1979: a monument to radical moments; La Virreina, Centre de la Imatge, Barcelona.
 Maqueta #1, Calendar #4, Finning; MACBA, Barcelona.

References 

Living people
1973 births
People from Barcelona
Artists from Barcelona
20th-century Spanish artists